Harold Joffre Tyrie (3 August 1915 – 22 February 2007) was a New Zealand track and field athlete who won a bronze medal at the 1938 British Empire Games.

Early life and family
Born in Dunedin on 3 August 1915, Tyrie was the son of William Leslie Tyrie and Annie Tyrie (née Miller). He was educated at Otago Boys' High School from 1929 to 1932. On 27 September 1940, he married Phyllis Mary McClelland at St John's Church, Millers Flat, and the couple went on to have three daughters.

Athletics
Representing Otago, Tyrie won the New Zealand national 440 yards title three times: in 1936, 1939, and 1940. At the 1938 British Empire Games in Sydney, he finished sixth in the final of the men's 440 yards, and was a member of the New Zealand quartet in the men's 4 x 440 yards relay that won the bronze medal.

He later turned to coaching, and trained athletes including Don Jowett and Robin Tait.

Rugby union
A second-row forward from the Southern Rugby Football Club in Dunedin, Tyrie played two representative rugby union games for Otago, in 1938 and 1941.

Military service
Tyrie graduated from the 12th Officer Cadet Training Unit in September 1942 and was commissioned as a temporary second lieutenant in the New Zealand Infantry. Later, in 1944, with the rank of corporal, Tyrie was wounded in Italy while serving with the 2nd New Zealand Expeditionary Force.

Later life and death
In later life, Tyrie was a ceramic artist of some note. He died in Christchurch on 22 February 2007.

References

1915 births
2007 deaths
Athletes from Dunedin
People educated at Otago Boys' High School
New Zealand male sprinters
Athletes (track and field) at the 1938 British Empire Games
Commonwealth Games bronze medallists for New Zealand
Commonwealth Games medallists in athletics
New Zealand rugby union players
Otago rugby union players
Rugby union locks
New Zealand military personnel of World War II
New Zealand ceramicists
20th-century ceramists
Rugby union players from Dunedin
Medallists at the 1938 British Empire Games